R399 road may refer to:
 R399 road (Ireland)
 R399 road (South Africa)